Some substances are poisonous to dogs through ingestion, contact or inhalation. The poisonous substances most commonly consumed by pet dogs include human foods (including chocolate and grapes), medication not suitable for animals, household products, and plants.

Exposure and signs of poisoning 
Signs of poisoning in dogs are different based on the cause and the type of exposure. If a dog has been exposed to a poison, a vet or emergency vet center should be contacted. There are three basic types of exposure a dog owner should be aware of: ingestion, contact, and inhalation.

Ingestion 
Poisons are usually ingested due to a curious dog eating or chewing on something that is poisonous or has some level of toxin in it. Unknowing dog owners also sometimes give their pet medications that they are unable to break down and metabolize, thus becoming poisonous to the dog. Keeping toxic substances out of a dog's reach will avoid such scenarios. Medications and food intended for human consumption should not be given to any dog. Ingesting poisons may cause drooling, vomiting, diarrhea, irritability, tremors, twitching, seizures, rapid heart beat, coma, or death.The velocity of these symptoms may differ on the poison or the quantity of poison consumption.

Contact 
Poisoning in dogs by contact happens when a dog gets the substance on their skin or coat. These can cause skin irritation and burns, but also become ingested when the dog attempts to clean the substance off their skin/coat by licking. Some of the substances can simply be immediately removed from the skin or coat. However, the dog may still need attention from a veterinarian.

Inhalation 
Inhaled toxins are toxins that have found their way into a dogs respiratory system. Usually inhaled toxins cause a dog to have difficulty breathing. If a dog owner is aware of inhalation of poisonous substances, professional medical intervention is recommended as these toxins can make their way to other organs within the body.

Substances

Human food
Many human foods may cause irritation to dogs or more serious problems when ingested in large amounts. In 2011, consumption of toxic foods was the number one cause of poisoning in dogs. In 2017, the ASPCA Animal Poison Control Center received 199,000 poisoning cases, almost one-fifth of which were the result of ingesting human foods.

Chocolate 

Chocolate is dangerous for dogs because they are unable to break down theobromine and caffeine, both of which are contained in chocolate. Darker chocolate and baking chocolate contain a higher amount of theobromine, thus they are more dangerous than milk chocolate or white chocolate. Small amounts of chocolate may cause vomiting or diarrhea, but larger amounts may begin to affect the heart and brain as well. Large amounts of chocolate have been known to cause the dog to suffer irregular heart rhythms or heart failure. 

Chocolate-style dog treats can be made with carob, which is similar to chocolate but is not toxic to dogs.

Grapes/raisins/currants

These include any fruit of the Vitis species. It is unclear what substance within these fruits is toxic to dogs. There are several theories: mycotoxin, salicylate, tartaric acid, or potassium bitartrate, are all naturally found in grapes and decrease blood flow to the kidneys. There may be no dose information to show how much is too much. This varies and one dog may tolerate grapes or raisins more than another.

Macadamia nuts

Macadamia nuts have been included in the top foods to not give dogs. Like grapes or raisins it has not been clearly identified what is in the nut that causes negative reactions in dogs. Very small amounts of the nut can cause adverse reactions – "as little as 1/10th of an ounce per roughly 2 pounds of body weight." Macadamia nuts are singled out as having higher toxicity. Other nuts in general, are high in fat and can cause a dog to become ill.

Xylitol
The FDA has issued alerts to notify the public that xylitol, a sugar substitute, is harmful to dogs. It is used in sugar free foods including gum and candy, and oral hygiene products. Some peanut butter will also contain xylitol. Xylitol can cause liver failure in dogs, as well as hypoglycemia due to the fact that it stimulates rapid insulin production in the canine pancreas. Some possible signs to watch for are loss of coordination, vomiting, or seizures. Xylitol is not always clearly labeled on sugar free foods. Ingredient listings should indicate if xylitol is in the product. Food labels with the listing for "sugar alcohol" may contain xylitol. Other names for xylitol include birch sugar, E967, Meso-Xylitol, Xilitol, Xylit, 1, 2, 3, 4, 5-Pentol, and Sucre de Bouleau.

Fruit pits and seeds

Apples are safe for dogs, but apple seeds are not. Apple seeds, persimmon, peach, and plum pits, as well as other fruit seeds or pits have "cyanogenic glycosides". For example, if an apple seed skin is broken as a dog is eating an apple, then cyanide could be released. Apple seeds should be removed before a dog is given the apple to eat.

Onions and garlic

The Alliaceae family, of the Allium genus, or the onion family, includes onion, garlic, shallots, scallions, chives, and leeks. These contain N-propyl disulfide and sodium N-propylthiosulfate which can cause red blood cell damage and anemia. Thiosulphate poisoning from onions can cause orange to dark red-tinged urine, vomiting, and diarrhea.

Medication

Human vitamin supplements can damage the digestive tract lining, especially those containing iron, and can lead to kidney and liver damage.

Ibuprofen and acetaminophen, commonly known as Motrin or Advil and Tylenol, can cause liver damage in dogs.

Human antidepressant drugs like Celexa can cause neurological problems in dogs. 

ADHD medications contain stimulants, such as methylphenidate, that if ingested even in small amounts can be life-threatening to dogs. Examples are Concerta, Vyvanse, Adderall, and Dexadrine.

Household products
Many cases of pet poisoning in the United States are caused by household products.

Substances with a pH greater than 7 are considered alkalis. Usually exposure causes some level of irritation. However, these substances generally have no taste odor which increases the chance of larger amounts being ingested by a dog. At high levels of consumption alkalis become a greater danger for dogs. Bleach, oven and drain/pipe cleaners, hair relaxers, and lye are examples of alkaline products.

Ethylene glycol, antifreeze, is extremely toxic to dogs. It has a sweet taste and thus dogs will drink it. As little as 2 1/2 tablespoons can kill a medium-sized dog in 2-3 days. This type of poisoning is often fatal as dog owners do not know their pet has ingested the antifreeze. De-icing fluids can also contain ethylene glycol.

Paraquat is used for weed and grass control. It is so toxic that blue dye is added so it is not confused with coffee, a pungent odor is added as a warning and a vomiting agent in case it is ingested. In the US, it can only be used by those with a commercial license for its use. It is one of the most commonly used herbicides worldwide. Outside of the US, the licensing requirements may not exist.

Pesticides 
Pesticides containing organophosphates can be fatal to dogs. "Disulfoton is an example found in rose care products." "They're considered junior-strength nerve agents because they have the same mechanism of action as nerve gases like sarin", explained Dana Boyd Barr, an exposure scientist at Emory University in Atlanta, Georgia, who has studied organophosphate poisoning. Organophosphates are not banned from use, but require licensing for use.

Rodenticides
Zinc phosphide is a common ingredient in rat poison or rodenticide. Zinc phosphide is a combination of phosphorus and zinc. If ingested, acid in a dog's stomach turns the compound into phosphine, which is a toxic gas. The phosphine gas crosses into the dog's cells and causes the cell to die. Signs of poisoning include vomiting, anxiety, and loss of coordination. If a dog has not eaten and has an empty stomach when ingesting zinc phosphide, signs may not be apparent for up to 12 hours.

Strychnine is another rodenticide that is dangerous and causes similar reactions to zinc phosphide exposure. If a dog survives 24-48 hours after this type of poisoning, they generally recover well.

Veterinary products

Rimadyl, Dermaxx and Previcox are types of NSAIDs specifically for veterinary use for osteoarthritis, inflammation, and pain control in dogs. These can cause liver/kidney issues in dogs. 

In most cases issues of poisoning by veterinary products are due to incorrect administration by the veterinarian or the dog owner.

Plants

Daffodil

Daffodils contain lycorine which can cause vomiting, drooling, diarrhea, stomach ache, heart, and breathing issues. Any part of the plant may induce side effects, but the bulb is the most toxic. At higher amounts the toxin can cause gastrointestinal issues or drop in blood pressure. 
Tulip

Any part of the tulip can be poisonous but the bulb is the most toxic causing irritation in the mouth and throat. Signs of this type of poisoning are drooling, vomiting, stomach ache, and diarrhea.

Azalea

Azaleas contain grayanotoxins. This toxin passes through the dog's body quickly and symptoms of vomiting, diarrhea, stomach pain, weakness, or abnormal hear rate usually subside in a few hours.

Oleander

Oleander contains cardiac glycosides oleandrin and nerioside, and when ingested can result in fatal heart abnormalities, muscle tremors, incoordination, vomiting, and bloody diarrhea. The signs can start with in a few hours and cause a dog's condition to decline quickly, thus treatment is often not successful.

Dieffenbachia

Dieffenbachia causes oral irritation, vomiting, and difficulty swallowing in dogs. This plant contains calcium oxalate crystals. After ingestion, a dog may have a hard time swallowing, begin drooling, or coughing as if choking. Dieffenbachia can cause damage to the liver and kidneys leading to death, comas or permanent damage to critical organs, including the liver and kidneys, which may even lead to death.

Sago palm

Sago palms are toxic and potentially fatal to all pets, producing symptoms that include vomiting, diarrhea, seizures and liver failure. The leaves and bark are both harmful, and the seeds (or "nuts") are even more toxic.

Cyclamen

Possibly all species of cyclamen are toxic to dogs. Cyclamen contains triterpenoid saponins that irritate skin and are toxic to dogs.

Castor bean

Castor beans or the castor oil plant contain ricin which is toxic to dogs. It can be fatal depending on how much of the plant is ingested. The beans of the plant have a higher concentration of ricin and if chewed instead of swallowed whole will cause increased toxicity levels.

Hemlock

The USDA lists water hemlock as “the most violently toxic plant that grows in North America”. Dog deaths due to hemlock poisoning are unusual, and most animal deaths are cows or other grazing animals. If a dog does ingest hemlock, the cicutoxin in the plant can be fatal very quickly as it causes the heart and nervous system to not be able to function normally.

Treatment
There are many possible treatment paths for poisoning in dogs. One of the most important parts of any treatment is timing. A dog that has been exposed to a toxic substance has a better chance of recovery if treatment is initiated quickly. A veterinarian can determine if inducing vomiting is an appropriate action to remove a poisonous substance from a dog's stomach. Treatment for swelling may require an anti-histamine or other inflammatory drug to reduce swelling. Dogs may be put under anesthesia in order for their stomach to be flushed or given an activated charcoal solution to prevent absorption in the stomach.

Blood tests will indicate enzyme levels related to liver, kidney and bowel functions. Blood tests will also show levels of red and white blood cells and platelet levels. Just as in humans there are established ranges for normal functions and blood tests results will indicate what may be malfunctioning in a dog's body.

In the case of poisons that cause liver damage, intravenous fluids assist in flushing toxins from the dog's body and may be combined with medications to help liver functions.

Treatment will be more effective if the type of poison is known.

References 

Poisons
Toxins
Dog health